Mitchell Fineran is an American football placekicker for the Purdue Boilermakers of the Big Ten Conference (Big Ten). Prior to enrolling at Purdue as a graduate transfer in 2021, he attended and played football at Samford University in the Southern Conference (SoCon) of the NCAA Division I Football Championship Subdivision (FCS). 

At Samford, Fineran earned 2018 SoCon All-Freshman Team, 2019 All-SoCon Second Team, and 2020-2021 FCS All-America Second Team honors. At Purdue, he was selected as a 2021 All-Big Ten Honorable Mention.

Early life and high school career 
Fineran attended Peach County High School in Fort Valley, Georgia, where he served as the placekicker on the Trojans’ football team from 2014-2017. As a junior, he helped the Trojans reach the 2016 Class state playoff semifinals. He finished the season with 10 made field goals, including a long of 52 yards, and 57-of-58 PATs. His junior placekicking performance earned him Georgia Class AAA All-State honors.

Entering his senior season, Fineran was named to the Preseason Georgia Class AAA All-State Team. As a senior, he was the highest scorer with 119 points (13-of-19 on field goals and 80-of-81 on PATs) on Peach County’s 2017 team that scored 646 points, which ranks as the 26th highest scoring team in the history of Georgia high school football. As Peach County’s kickoff specialist, he had the second-most touchbacks on kickoffs in the nation as a senior. In the 2017 Class AAA state championship game, Fineran was Peach County’s lone scoring, converting 50-yard and 37-yard field goals, in a 10-6 loss to Calhoun High School. His senior performance earned him Class AAA All-State honors.

His 32 career field goals are tied for eighth-most all-time in Georgia state high school football history. He successfully converted five field goals of 50 yards or more in his high school career. He is one of only 14 kickers in Georgia high school football history to make multiple field goals of 52 yards or more. He finished his high school career having made 32-of-51 field goal attempts and 193-of-205 PATs.

In 2016 and 2017, he attended the Southern Showcase Camp. In 2017, he attended the National Scholarship Camp. Kohl’s Kicking rated Fineran as a five-star placekicker and ranked him No. 37 placekicker nationally and No. 4 in the state of Georgia among placekickers in the Class of 2018. He was invited to and played in the Rising Seniors All-Star Game, which was broadcast on ESPN. As a college recruit prospect, Fineran committed to attend and play football for the Samford Bulldogs over an offer from Army.

College career

Samford 
As a freshman, Fineran served as the Samford Bulldogs primary placekicker and appeared in all 11 games. He recorded his first and only career fumble recovery in Samford’s Week 5 game against Kennesaw State. He converted his then-career-long field goal of 46 yards against Furman. He finished his freshman campaign making 13-of-17 field goals and all 50 PATs. His 89 points scored led the Southern Conference. He was named to the 2018 SoCon All-Freshman Team.

Entering his sophomore season, Fineran was named to the Preseason All-SoCon First Team and the watch list for the Fred Mitchell Award, which recognizes the top placekicker in FCS, Division II, Division III, National Association of Intercollegiate Athletics (NAIA), and National Junior College Athletic Association (NJCAA) who exemplifies continued community service.

Continuing to serve as the Bulldogs primary placekicker, he started the 2019 season by making his first seven field goal attempts. He recorded his first and only career reception (seven yards) on a fake field goal play against Furman. He earned SoCon Player of the Week honors for his kicking performance against the Citadel.

His streak of 91 consecutive PATs made over the 2018 and 2019 seasons is the seventh-longest PAT streak in SoCon history. His 91 points scored led the Southern Conference for the second consecutive season. He also led the Conference in field goals made (15) and field goals made per game (1.5). His 2019 performance earned him All-SoCon Second Team honors as well as selection to the 2019 Fred Mitchell Award Top 10 List. His sophomore efforts earned him 2019 All-SoCon Second Team honors.

Entering his junior season, Fineran was named to the Preseason All-SoCon First Team. After Samford’s season was postponed to the spring of 2021 due to the COVID-19 pandemic, Fineran continued in his role as the Bulldogs’ primary placekicker in their abbreviated seven-game season, appearing in every game. In the first quarter of the Bulldogs’ game against Furman, he made a career-long 50-yard field goal en route to a 3-for-3 field goal and 4-for-4 PAT effort. He finished the season making 15-of-18 field goals, with a long of 50 yards, and 32-of-33 PATs.  His 2.14 field goals per game ranked third among all kickers in the FCS. His 15 made field goals tied for the most in the FCS. His was the third-highest scoring FCS player with 77 points.

After his junior performance, he was selected to the FCS All-America Second Team and All-SoCon First Team.

Purdue 
After graduating from Samford, Fineran enrolled at Purdue as a graduate transfer, joined the football team, and served as the Boilermakers primary placekicker for the 2021 season. On November 11, he tied a career-high for single-game points scored with 16, successfully converting all four field goal attempts and all four PATs, in Purdue’s 40-29 upset win over No. 3-ranked Michigan State. He again tied this 16-point mark in Purdue’s 48-45 bowl game victory over Tennessee in the 2021 Music City Bowl, including the game-winning field goal in overtime.

In 2021, Fineran’s 24 field goals made tied for the most in the Big Ten, third-most in the nation, and second-most in a single season in Purdue program history. His field goal percentage of 82.8% ranks as the best all-time Purdue career percentage (minimum 15 attempts) and second-best all-time in a single season (one field goal attempt per game minimum) in Purdue football history, as well as 25th-best in the nation in 2021. His 29 field goals attempted were the most in the Big Ten, tied for the fourth-most in the nation, and third-most in a single season in Purdue program history. His 1.85 field goals per game ranked third-most in the nation. His 11 field goals made of 20-29 yards were the most in the Big Ten and tied for the third-most in the nation. His 12 field goals made of 30-39 yards were the second-most in the Big Ten and the nation. His four field goals made against Michigan State and Tennessee are tied for third-most in a single game in Purdue history.

His 2021 kicking performance earned him All-Big Ten Honorable Mention honors from both the Big Ten Coaches and the Big Ten Media.

College statistics 

*The 2020 Southern Conference football season was postponed to and played from February to April 2021 due to the COVID-19 pandemic.

Personal life 
In college, Fineran has been involved in community volunteer work, including the Exceptional Foundation, Volunteer Magic City Woodworks, as a Samford Student Athlete Mentor at Goodyear Elementary School, and Habitat for Humanity Volunteer Summers.

At Samford, he was named to the 2019 Southern Conference Academic Honors List. He graduated from Samford with a bachelor’s degree in Sports Administration and is currently pursuing a master’s degree in Technology, Leadership, and Innovation at Purdue.

References

External links 
 Purdue Boilermakers bio
 Samford Bulldogs bio

Living people
Purdue Boilermakers football players
Samford Bulldogs football players
People from Fort Valley, Georgia
Sportspeople from Georgia (U.S. state)
Players of American football from Georgia (U.S. state)
American football placekickers
Year of birth missing (living people)